Mark III or Mark 3 often refers to the third version of a product, frequently military hardware. "Mark", meaning "model" or "variant", can be abbreviated "Mk."

Mark III or Mark 3 can specifically refer to:

Arts and entertainment
 Mk III: The Final Concerts, a 1975 concert album by Deep Purple
 Emergency Medical Hologram Mark III, a character on the television series Star Trek: Voyager
 Mark III, a fictional cybernetic tank in the game Ogre
 Mark III Flying Car, a fictional vehicle driven by Danger Mouse
 Cobra Mk III, a spaceship in the computer game Elite

Technology

Military and weaponry
 Mark III, a variant of the British Mark I tank
 Supermarine Spitfire Mk III; a single 1940 British fighter aircraft pre-production prototype
 Mk III Turtle helmet (1944); British Army helmet that first saw action in the Normandy Landings
 Merkava Mark III (1989); battle tank of Israel Defense Forces
 Ruger MK III (2004), an American handgun

Other vehicles
 Geosynchronous Satellite Launch Vehicle Mark III, a launch vehicle
 Aston Martin DB Mark III (1957-1959), a British luxury sports car
 AC Cobra MkIII (aka Shelby Cobra), an American-engined British sports car produced intermittently since 1962
Superformance MkIII, a mass-produced replica of the AC Cobra MkIII
 Continental Mark III (1958, 1969–1971), an American personal luxury car
 British Rail Mark 3 (1976); a rail carriage design for high-speed and regular service
 Kolb Mark III ultralight aircraft

Other technologies
 Mark III (radio telescope), a radio telescope in England, constructed in 1966
 Mark III (space suit), a NASA space suit prototype
 Mark III containment design, a third generation General Electric BWR-6 boiling water nuclear reactor design
 Camera models:
Canon EOS-1D Mark III
Canon EOS-1Ds Mark III
 Harvard Mark III, an early computer built at Harvard University and used by the US Navy
 Mesa Boogie Mark III, an electric guitar amplifier
 Sega Mark III, the original Japanese branding of Sega Master System, a video game console
 Vox Mark III, a teardrop-shaped electric guitar of the 1960s

Religion
 Mark 3 or Mark III, the third chapter of the Gospel of Mark in the New Testament of the Christian Bible
 Pope Mark III of Alexandria, patriarch of the Coptic Church from 1116 to 1189